Various is the debut EP by the Japanese visual kei band DIMLIM, from the label Ultimate Illuminati (subsidiary of Tower Records). It was originally released on June 3, 2017, exclusively at the band's debut show in Ikebukuro Black Hole. For sale, it was released in two editions, regular and limited, on August 23, 2017. 

The promotional video for Shochou (初潮) aired the same day. The song uses a sample from the song Children, by Robert Miles.

DIMLIM relaunched for sale the live limited edition version in their official store, opened in May 2020.

DIMLIM then re-released the EP digitally on Sootify, Apple Music, and YouTube on August 10th 2022. This was alongside their single The Silent Song, which was digitally re-released on the same day.

Charts 
The album peaked at number 164 on the Oricon charts.

Track listing

Personnel 
 Sho - Singing
 Retsu - Guitar
 Ryuya - Guitar
 Tsubasa - Bass
 Issei - Drums

References 

Japanese-language EPs
2017 debut EPs
Dimlim albums
Metalcore EPs